Supanida Katethong (born 26 October 1997) is a Thai badminton player. She started playing badminton at aged nine, and join the Thailand national junior team in 2015. She won her first international title at the 2014 Singapore International tournament in the women's singles event. In the early of 2015, she won the women's singles title at the Granular Thailand International Challenge tournament. In May 2015, she won double titles at the Smiling Fish International tournament in the women's singles and doubles event. She also won the Sri Lanka International tournament in the women's singles event.

Achievements

BWF World Tour (1 runner-up) 
The BWF World Tour, which was announced on 19 March 2017 and implemented in 2018, is a series of elite badminton tournaments sanctioned by the Badminton World Federation (BWF). The BWF World Tour is divided into levels of World Tour Finals, Super 1000, Super 750, Super 500, Super 300, and the BWF Tour Super 100.

Women's singles

BWF International Challenge/Series (7 titles, 2 runners-up) 
Women's singles

Women's doubles

  BWF International Challenge tournament
  BWF International Series tournament

References

External links 
 

Living people
1997 births
Supanida Katethong
Supanida Katethong
Competitors at the 2021 Southeast Asian Games
Supanida Katethong
Southeast Asian Games medalists in badminton
Supanida Katethong
Supanida Katethong